Frida Karolina Röhl, (born 30 September 1971) is a Swedish actress and director. And since 2004 the artistic director for Teater Tribunalen in Stockholm. Röhl is educated at Teaterhögskolan in Malmö and she has become a known name also as a director. She also is a teacher at Stockholms dramatiska högskola, and from March 2014 she is the boss at Folkteatern in Gothenburg.

For television she has played the part of the countess Tessin in the drama series August and in 2009 she was part of the Julkalendern Superhjältejul which was broadcast on SVT.

Filmography 
2007 - August 
2009 - Superhjältejul
2012 - Odjuret
2012 - Call Girl

References

External links

 

1971 births
Swedish theatre directors
Swedish film actresses
Living people
Swedish television actresses
People from Gotland